MetroRapid is an express bus system in Tampa, Florida. Operated by Hillsborough Area Regional Transit, it incorporates some bus rapid transit features. Currently, there is only one line in operation, the North-South line, with an East-West line in the planning phase. Subsequent lines could open depending on the success of the two initial lines.

History and planning

HART began preliminary planning for a bus rapid transit (BRT) system in 2004, with studies launched in 2005. What is now known as the MetroRapid North-South Line was selected in 2005 to become the first leg of the system, after initial plans to have BRT run along interstate corridors deteriorated. The Nebraska Ave corridor is HART's busiest bus corridor . A second route connecting East Tampa to Tampa International Airport via Hillsborough Ave and MLK Blvd was also brought up. In August 2006, the Hillsborough County Board of Commissioners voted to invest $40 million into the BRT project. Further funding has been obtained since then for the North-South route. However, the East-West route remains largely unfunded.

Funding

Hillsborough County Community Investment Tax funded the design and construction phases of the MetroRapid North-South project. A June 2012 review of the original project estimate of $31 million determined that the project was under budget by $5.7 million. This funding has been reallocated back to Hillsborough County for its infrastructure needs, if desired. CIT funding is only earmarked for capital improvement costs, and cannot be reallocated for operational costs, such as bus routes.

North-South Line 

The MetroRapid North-South Line consists of an approximately 12.5 mile route along Fletcher Avenue and Nebraska Avenue, from Downtown Tampa to USF Area, with 52 stations along the line. It uses 12 low-floor buses, and transit signal priority in order to shorten red lights and lengthen green lights to make transit faster along the line. At major stations, there are ticket vending machines, in order to speed up the boarding process.

Construction of the North-South line began on August 6, 2012 and was largely completed by March, 2013. A two-week soft opening phase took place between May 28, 2013 and June 7, 2013, by which customers could use MetroRapid for free. The line officially began revenue service on June 10, 2013.

Since October 8, 2017, HART established more stops to the Downtown-USF Line, replacing Route 2. The segment to USF to Hidden River Complix is run Weekdays for Route 33.

Operating schedule
()

Weekday, 15-minute service from Marion Transit Center (MTC) to University Area Transit Center (UATC)
Saturday/Sunday, 30-minute service from Marion Transit Center (MTC) to University Area Transit Center (UATC)

Future

HART is planning a second line, called the East-West Line. This line is largely unfunded, and HART is seeking federal funding to assist with this portion of the project. Subsequent lines are planned for the Dale Mabry Highway corridor from Lutz to MacDill Air Force Base, New Tampa via Bruce B. Downs Blvd, and the Selmon Expressway corridor between Downtown Tampa and Brandon. These subsequent lines will be dependent on the success of the two initial lines.

Some information regarding proposed MetroRapid routes came from this link

East-West Line
MetroRapid East-West will connect Tampa International Airport, the Westshore Business District and the HART Netpark bus transfer center at Hillsborough Avenue and 56th Street, with connections to the North-South line at Martin Luther King Jr. Boulevard.

External links
HART BRT project information
East-West Line information
North-South Line information

Hillsborough Area Regional Transit
Proposed public transportation in Florida
2013 establishments in Florida